3.3  may refer to:

 Chrysler 3.3 engine, Chrysler's first homegrown front wheel drive 60° V6 engine
 K Desktop Environment 3.3, the fourth release in the third series of releases of K Desktop Environment

See also

 3 + 3
 3 in Three
 3/3 (disambiguation)
 3@Three